Harry Edgar Ryan (21 November 1893 – 14 April 1961) was a British track cycling racer. Ryan came second in the world amateur sprint championship in 1913. He competed at the 1920 Summer Olympics and won the tandem competition with Thomas Lance, as well as a bronze medal in the sprint.

Ryan lived at 312 Euston Road, St Pancras, London in 1901. His father was a cutler, toolmaker and shopkeeper of Buck & Ryan. After retiring from competitions, Ryan converted Buck & Ryan into a successful concern. He also became a prominent cycling administrator, supervising most of the major competitions in Europe.

References

External links
Profile at databaseolympics.com

1893 births
1961 deaths
English male cyclists
English Olympic medallists
English track cyclists
Olympic cyclists of Great Britain
Cyclists at the 1920 Summer Olympics
Olympic gold medallists for Great Britain
Olympic bronze medallists for Great Britain
Olympic medalists in cycling
Medalists at the 1920 Summer Olympics
People from St Pancras, London
Cyclists from Greater London